Asha Rashid is a  Tanzanian footballer who plays as a forward  for  the Tanzanian women's national team.

References

Living people
Tanzanian women's footballers
Women's association football midfielders
Tanzania women's international footballers
Year of birth missing (living people)